Pendik is a district of Istanbul, Turkey on the Asian side between Kartal and Tuzla, on the Marmara Sea. Home to Sabiha Gökçen International Airport.  Population is 711,894. It also neighbours Sultanbeyli, Sancaktepe and Çekmeköy from northwest, Şile from north and Gebze from northeast.

History 
There are records of settlements in Pendik going back to 5,000 years ago, a Greek settlement in 753 BC, and many more conquests. In 1080, the town was taken over by the Seljuk Turks, and recaptured by the Byzantines in 1086 and so on. During the Byzantine era, the place was called Pantikion or Pentikion, and before that Pantikap[a]ion in Greek (as the town had five walls, or five gates, or both). Pendik was always a retreat from the city, and by the 20th century was peppered with holiday and weekend homes of Istanbul's wealthy. It was part of Kartal district till 1987. Tuzla one separated from it in 1992. Pendik had present borders with return boroughs of Güzelyalı and Esenyalı (now divided between Güzelyalı, Orhangazi, Esenyalı, Fatih and Ahmet Yesevi ones) from Tuzla in 1994.

Pendik today 

Until the 1970s Pendik was a rural area, far from the city. Today Pendik is a crowded mix of working class housing (especially further towards the E5 motorway) with more expensive apartments with sea views along the coast. There is a busy shopping district (with a large street market on Saturdays), restaurants and movie theaters.
Pendik is far from downtown Istanbul. It is served by Marmaray suburban trains. Since 25 July 2014, high-speed services to Ankara start from this station, pending termination of the upgrades on the line to Istanbul proper. In 2016, an extension of the M4 line of the Istanbul Metro was completed.
The coastal road is fast but does not carry public transport, except for the bus 16A which only runs until 8pm and the Kadikoy-Bostanci-Pendik dolmus. There is road construction going on in the Pendik/Tuzla/Gebze region, which has seen industrial development in the 1990s.
Over the centuries, Bosniaks have migrated to Turkey, with a large number arriving after the Austro-Hungarian campaign in Bosnia and Herzegovina in 1878. Many settled in the Pendik boroughs of Sapanbağları, Yeşilbağlar and Bahçelievler. Apart from naming their streets and shops after their village in Bosnia, these people have blended into the Istanbul working-class lifestyle of the rest of Pendik.
In the late 1990s two private educational institutions were built inland from Pendik, Koç Özel Lisesi and Sabancı University. The area has a Formula One racetrack. There is a high-speed boat across the Marmara Sea to Yalova for people travelling out of the city to Bursa and the Aegean. Sabiha Gökçen airport is near.
And currently mayor is Ahmet Cin from AK Parti.

Climate 
Pendik experiences a borderline Mediterranean climate (Csa/Cs) and a humid subtropical climate (Cfa/Cf) according to both Köppen and Trewartha climate classifications, with cool winters and warm to hot summers. A warm district, it is in USDA hardiness zone 9a and AHS heat zone 4, allowing the cultivation of certain cold-hardy subtropical plants. While in southern Istanbul, it is still affected by Foehn winds, because of its position north of the highlands in Yalova.

Twin cities 
  Comrat, Moldova
  Novi Pazar, Serbia

References

External links 

 Pendik Municipality website 
 Pendik High School website 
 Pendik Guide
 Pendik News

 
Populated places in Istanbul Province
Fishing communities in Turkey
Districts of Istanbul Province